Scopula isodesma is a moth of the  family Geometridae. It is found in Australia (New South Wales).

References

Moths described in 1903
isodesma
Moths of Australia